Abdelmounaim Boutouil (born 9 January 1998) is a Moroccan professional footballer who plays as a defender for South African club Mamelodi Sundowns.

Career statistics

Club
.

References

1998 births
Living people
Moroccan footballers
Morocco youth international footballers
Moroccan expatriate footballers
AS FAR (football) players
KAC Kénitra players
Raja CA players
Royale Union Saint-Gilloise players
SCC Mohammédia players
Botola players
Association football defenders
Moroccan expatriate sportspeople in Belgium
Expatriate footballers in Belgium
2020 African Nations Championship players
Morocco A' international footballers
Moroccan expatriate sportspeople in South Africa
Expatriate soccer players in South Africa
Mamelodi Sundowns F.C. players